Glen Campbell Live is the fourth live album by American musician Glen Campbell, a UK only release from November 1981. It has been re-released in various formats and under various titles since, including Glen Campbell Presents His Hits in Concert in 1990.

Track listing
Side 1:
 "Rhinestone Cowboy" (Larry Weiss) – 3:15
 "Gentle on My Mind" (John Hartford) – 2:06
 "Medley" – 4:29
 "Wichita Lineman" (Jimmy Webb)
 "Galveston" (Jimmy Webb)
 "Country Boy (You Got Your Feet in L.A.)" (Dennis Lambert, Brian Potter)
 "By The Time I Get To Phoenix" (Jimmy Webb) – 2:45
 "Dreams of the Everyday Housewife" (Chris Gantry) – 2:12
 "Heartache Number Three" (Steve Hardin) – 2:56
 "Please Come to Boston" (Dave Loggins) – 3:42

Side 2:
 "Trials and Tribulations" (Michael Smotherman) – 3:22
 "It's Only Make Believe" (Conway Twitty, Jack Nance) – 2:39
 "Crying" (Roy Orbison, Joe Melson) – 3:35
 "Bluegrass Medley" – 5:15
 "Foggy Mountain Breakdown" (Earl Scruggs)
 "Orange Blossom Special" (Ervin T. Rouse) 
 "Milk Cow Blues" (Kokomo Arnold) – 5:18

Side 3:
 "Rollin' (In My Sweet Baby's Arms)" (J. Clement) – 3:35
 "I'm So Lonesome I Could Cry" (Hank Williams) – 3:27
 "Southern Nights" (Allen Toussaint) – 3:59
 "Amazing Grace" (John Newton) – 4:31

Side 4:
 "Try a Little Kindness" (Curt Sapaugh, Bobby Austin) – 2:36
 "Loving Arms" (Tom Jans)" – 3:31
 "It's Your World" (Steve Hardin) – 4:20
 "Mull of Kintyre" (Paul McCartney, Denny Laine) – 6:12

Personnel
Glen Campbell – vocals, acoustic guitar, electric guitar, bagpipes
Kim Darrigan – bass guitar, bass fiddle
Craig Fall – acoustic guitar, electric guitar, keyboards
Steve Hardin – vocals, harmonica, keyboards
Carl Jackson – vocals, banjo, acoustic guitar, electric guitar, fiddle
T.J. Kuenster – background vocals, piano
Steve Turner – drums

Production
Producer – Howard Kruger
Engineer – Bill "The Scott" Irving
Recorded by The Manor Mobile
Concert sound by E.S.E. Ltd.
Lightning by Zenith Lightning
Mixed at the Manor, Oxford and The Town House, London
Recorded and mixed by Howard Kruger for Energetic Enterprises Ltd.
Album designed by Nigel Goodall
Photographs courtesy of R.T.E. Television, Ireland and Keith Toogood

1981 live albums
Glen Campbell live albums
RCA Records live albums